White Eagle is an adventure published by Game Designers' Workshop (GDW) in 1990 for the post-apocalyptic military tabletop role-playing game Twilight: 2000.

Content
In the original Twilight: 2000 game, many of the adventures focus on soldiers stranded in Central Europe following a fictional World War III known in the game as the "Twilight War". White Eagle is the third part of the Return to Europe trilogy, preceded by The Free City of Krakow (1985), and The Black Madonna (1985). This adventure is set in Silesia about a year after the events of the first two adventures. The player characters' nemesis, General Julian Filipowitz, has become the despot King Julian. The player characters join forces with the People's Army to attempt to overthrow the tyrant.

Publication history
GDW published the first edition of Twilight: 2000 in 1984. Many adventures and supplements followed including White Eagle, a 48-page book published in 1990 that was written by Loren K. Wiseman, with interior art by Tim Bradstreet, Liz Danforth, and Kirk Wescom, and cover art by Jim Holloway.

White Eagle was the last adventure published for the first edition of Twilight: 2000 — shortly after its release, GDW published a second edition of the game.

Reviews
White Wolf #25 (February/March 1991)
Terra Traveller Times, Issue 28 (March 1990, p. 5)
Far & Away, Issue 2 (November 1990, p. 56)

References

Role-playing game supplements introduced in 1990
Science fiction role-playing game adventures
Twilight: 2000